Events from the year 1652 in Denmark.

Incumbents 
 Monarch – Frederick III
 Steward of the Realm – Joachim Gersdorff

Events

Culture

Art
 Lorentz Jørgensen completes the altarpiece in St. Nicholas' Church in Køge.
  Erik Brockenhuus of Lerbæk Manor presents a chalice created by Claus Christensen (Odense) to  Hover Church.

Births

Deaths 

 19 April – Jesper Brochmand, theologian and Bishop of Zealand (born 1585)
Undated
 Jørgen Ringnis, woodcarver

References

External links

 
Denmark
Years of the 17th century in Denmark